Emily Ellen Rudd (born February 24, 1993) is an American actress. She played Cindy Berman in the Netflix horror film trilogy Fear Street.

Career 
In 2018, appeared in the Amazon anthology series The Romanoffs. and Philip K. Dick's Electric Dreams. In 2021, she appeared in Fear Street Part Two: 1978 and Fear Street Part Three: 1666 in the dual roles of Cindy Berman and Abigail. In 2021, she was also cast in a recurring role in Hunters.<ref>{{cite web|last1=Petski|first1=Denise|title=Hunters': Tommy Martinez, Emily Rudd & Udo Kier Join Season 2 As Recurring
|url=https://deadline.com/2021/07/hunters-tommy-martinez-emily-rudd-udo-kier-season-2-recurring-1234796192/|website=Deadline Hollywood|access-date=July 20, 2021|date=November 10, 2021}}</ref> In 2021, she was also cast in the romantic comedy science fiction film Moonshot.

In November, 2021, It was announced that Rudd was cast as Nami in the live-action Netflix series based on the manga One Piece''.

Personal life
She's the second daughter of her parents Michelle and Jeffrey Rudd. She grew up in Saint Paul,  Minnesota. She began to be interested in acting from an early age, so when she finished school, she graduated in performing arts and decided to embark on an artistic career. Rudd started as a model in her hometown and then became an actress. She currently lives in Los Angeles.

Rudd was in a relationship with electronic dance music producer Justin Blau from 2015 to 2021. The two had met when she was starring in his music video for "We Came To Bang". Seven months later, the two began dating.

Filmography

Film

Television

Short

References

External links

1993 births
Actresses from Saint Paul, Minnesota
American television actresses
American film actresses
20th-century American actresses
21st-century American actresses
20th-century American women
21st-century American women
Living people